Leigh Gloury (25 September 1929 – 31 July 2014) was an Australian rules footballer who played with Melbourne in the Victorian Football League (VFL).

Notes

External links 		

		
		
	
1929 births			
2014 deaths
Australian rules footballers from Victoria (Australia)		
Melbourne Football Club players
Frankston Bombers players